Rita Ekwere (born 2 August 1994), better known under her stage name of Ray BLK (pronounced "Ray Black"), is a British singer and songwriter who was born in Nigeria, and grew up in Catford in London. She won the BBC's Sound of 2017, and was the first unsigned artist to do so. On 28 October 2016, she released her debut mini-album, Durt, and in January 2018 signed to the UK branch of Island Records. Her debut full-length studio album, Access Denied, was released to critical acclaim in October 2021.

Background
Ray BLK, whose real name is Rita Ekwere, was born in Nigeria and moved to London when she was about four. She grew up in Catford. At the age of 13 she formed a music group with her school friend MNEK called "New Found Content". She studied for a degree in English literature at Brunel University, and her dissertation was on post-colonial Nigerian literature, focusing on the novels of Chinua Achebe and Chimamanda Adichie. She worked in an advertising agency to sustain her music career in its early days.

Her stage surname BLK stands for Building Living Knowing, which she describes as her three main values.

Music career
Ray released her first recordings while studying for her English degree. Her debut EP Havisham was released in 2015. Inspired by Miss Havisham's story in Charles Dickens' Great Expectations, it told the tale of a girl who turns against men after having her heartbroken. According to Ray "I felt like Miss Havisham was like a lot of women around me, who got their heartbroken and turned cold and began to hate men." Ray releases music on her own label and has avoided signing a record deal to retain the rights to her music. In 2016 she self-released her debut mini-album Durt, featuring collaborations with Stormzy, Wretch 32 and SG Lewis. Her single "My Hood" is a song about her home town of Catford. She wrote it at a time when she had just been robbed, and she felt like she just wanted to leave.

She was nominated for best newcomer at the 2016 MOBO Awards. On 6 January 2017, Ray was announced as the winner of the BBC's Sound of 2017.

In 2019, Ray BLK was the opening act for the UK leg of The Nicki Wrld Tour, the headlining tour by American rapper Nicki Minaj.

In November 2019, she released a song called "Action" with rapper Chip, then went on to teasing more music with 3 snippets on Instagram from her upcoming debut album which will be released in 2021.

In July 2021, she released a single "MIA" featuring American singer Kaash Paige and announced that her debut album Access Denied would be released on 17 September 2021 through Island Records, later delayed to 1 October. Upon release the album attracted critical acclaim and was listed as one of the best albums of 2021 by NME.

Discography

Studio albums

Mini-albums

Mixtapes

Singles

As a lead artist

As a featured artist

Promotional singles

Other charted songs

Guest appearances

References

External links

1994 births
English people of Nigerian descent
Black British women rappers
Singers from London
English songwriters
People from Catford
Living people
21st-century Black British women singers